The following list includes all of the Canadian Register of Historic Places listings in North Shore, British Columbia, including:
North Shore Mountains,
North Vancouver City,
North Vancouver District Municipality, and
West Vancouver District Municipality.

North Vancouver
North Vancouver (city)
North Vancouver (district municipality)